Frederick Geddes Grant OBE (4 October 1891 – 26 June 1946) was a Trinidadian cricketer, cricket administrator and businessman.

Life and career
Fred Grant was the oldest of 10 children of Thomas Geddes Grant (born in Canada in 1866), who founded a trading company, T. Geddes Grant, in Trinidad in 1901. He was born in 1891 in Port of Spain, where he went to school at Queen's Royal College, and later had his university education in Canada.

A middle-order batsman and change bowler, Grant played six first-class matches for Trinidad between 1925 and 1927. When Trinidad won the final of the Inter-Colonial Tournament in 1925-26 he top-scored in Trinidad's successful run-chase in the second innings with 45. He captained Trinidad in 1926-27 when they lost the final to Barbados after leading by 384 on the first innings.

Grant was President of the West Indies Cricket Board of Control in the 1930s. His younger brothers Jack and Rolph captained the West Indies Test team in the 1930s.

Fred Grant was awarded the OBE in 1935. After the death of his father he led the family company, T. Geddes Grant, until his own death. He died suddenly of heart failure in June 1946 while visiting one of his brothers in Toronto.

References

External links
 
 Fred Grant at CricketArchive

1891 births
1946 deaths
Cricketers from Port of Spain
Alumni of Queen's Royal College, Trinidad
Trinidad and Tobago cricketers
20th-century Trinidad and Tobago businesspeople
Trinidad and Tobago cricket administrators
Officers of the Order of the British Empire
Fred
Trinidad and Tobago emigrants to Canada